Easy Date (born 1972) was an outstanding Quarter Horse racehorse and broodmare.

Life

Easy Date was a 1972 bay daughter of American Quarter Horse Association (or AQHA) Hall of Fame member Easy Jet out of a Thoroughbred mare named Spot Cash. Spot Cash was a descendant of Teddy and Man o' War.

Racing career 
Easy Date won the 1974 All American Futurity as well as the 1975 Rainbow Derby and the 1975 Golden State Derby. She was named AQHA World Champion Quarter Running Horse in 1975, and the 1974 AQHA Champion Quarter Running Two-Year-Old Filly. During her race career, she won 22 races and $849,710.00 in earnings along with an AQHA Superior Race Horse award.

Breeding record and honors 
After the end of Easy Date's racing career, she was the mother of eleven foals, eight of whom earned their Race Register of Merit with the AQHA. Three of her foals won stakes races and one was a Superior Race Horse award winner. Her offspring earned a total of $101,931.00 on the racetrack.

Easy Date was inducted into the AQHA Hall of Fame in 2002.

Pedigree

Notes

References

 Easy Date Pedigree at All Breed Pedigree Database accessed on October 6, 2007
 
 Easy Date record at Quarter Horse Directory accessed on October 6, 2007

External links
 Easy Date at Quarter Horse Legends

American Quarter Horse racehorses
Racehorses bred in the United States
Racehorses trained in the United States
1972 racehorse births
AQHA Hall of Fame (horses)